Moritz Göttel (born 12 February 1993) is a German footballer who plays as a striker for VfV 06 Hildesheim.

Career

Statistics

References

External links

1993 births
Living people
Borussia Mönchengladbach II players
SV Babelsberg 03 players
VfL Bochum players
VfL Bochum II players
VfV 06 Hildesheim players
German footballers
3. Liga players
Regionalliga players
Sportspeople from Braunschweig
Association football forwards
Footballers from Lower Saxony